Swat the Spy is a 1918 American silent comedy-drama film directed by Arvid E. Gillstrom and starring Jane Lee, Katherine Lee, Charles Slattery, Pat Hartigan, and Florence Ashbrooke. The film was released by Fox Film Corporation on September 29, 1918.

Plot

Cast
Jane Lee as Jane Sheldon
Katherine Lee as Katherine Sheldon
Charles Slattery as Andrew Sheldon
Pat Hartigan as Karl Schmidt (as P.C. Hartigan)
Florence Ashbrooke as Lena Muller

Preservation
Incomplete prints survived at the Library of Congress and Academy Film Archive.

References

External links

1918 comedy-drama films
1910s English-language films
1918 films
American silent feature films
American black-and-white films
Fox Film films
1910s American films
Silent American comedy-drama films